The Hungarian Ground Forces is the land branch of the Hungarian Defence Forces, and is responsible for ground activities and troops including artillery, tanks, APCs, IFVs and ground support. Hungary's ground forces served in Iraq, and are currently in service in the KFOR.

Previous Hungarian ground forces have included the Royal Hungarian Landwehr, the Royal Hungarian Army and the ground force components of the Hungarian People's Army. Hungary was supported by the Soviet Union during the Cold War, and was a member of the Warsaw Pact. Since the Soviet Union's fall in 1991, Hungary reduced numbers of tanks and troops, and closed garrisons. The Hungarian Army now deals with national security, peacekeeping and international conflicts. Hungary joined NATO in 1999.

History 

In 1963, the Ground Forces included the 5th Army of Hungary, formed in 1961, at Székesfehérvár. This formation included the 7th Motor Rifle Division at Kiskunfélegyháza, the 8th Motor Rifle Division at Zalaegerszeg, the 9th Motor Rifle Division at Kaposvár, and the 11th Tank Division at Tata. This Formation also included the 34th Special Reconnaissance Battalion at Székesfehérvár, which was also a sub unit of the 5th Army. The other big combat formation of the Ground Forces were the 3rd Army Corps at Cegléd (with the 4th Motor Rifle Division at Gyöngyös and the 15th Motor Rifle Division at Nyíregyháza).

Michael Holm writes that the 3rd Army Corps at Cegléd, Military Unit Number 6639, (see :hu:3. Hadtest, with the 66th Communications Battalion and 3rd Security Battalion both at Cegled, 4th Motor Rifle Division at Gyöngyös and the 15th Motor Rifle Division at Nyíregyháza) was established on 1 November 1966, and was identically organised in 1970 and 1980, but by 1988 was reorganised to consist of four mechanised infantry, one tank brigades, and one artillery brigade and three artillery regiments (AA Missile; Anti-Aircraft Artillery; and Anti-Tank Artillery), plus other smaller units.

With the fall of the Warsaw Pact both 5th Army and the 3rd Mechanized Corps were disbanded in 1991. Following this, the Hungarian Defense Forces inherited the assets and personnel of the Hungarian People's Army. However, due to the changed geopolitical situation, the Army started a more drastic reduction of its forces, which also affected its assets.. The reduction was partly justified by the accession to the CFE Treaty and partly due to the fact that the national economic performance at the time was not sufficient to maintain and supply such a large force.

Following the country's accession to NATO, the procurement of newer and more modern multi-purpose equipment began. These include, in addition to vehicles of various types and purposes, RÁBA supply vehicles, Mercedes UNIMOG and MAN trucks, Mercedes-Benz G 270 CDI off-road passenger vehicles, communication equipment, flak jackets and helmets, new small arms, Skylark I unmanned aerial vehicles and so on. 
In addition, several old existing assets have been modernized: various radar locators (e.g. P-18M and SZT-68U), the 2K12 Kub anti-aircraft missile complexes were modernized in a Polish-Hungarian cooperation (2K12M), the 9M111 Fagot and 9M113 Konkurs guided anti-tank missiles underwent service life extensions, and attempts were made to modernize the BTR-80 armored personnel carriers in the 2000s with limited results. The old Soviet-origin technology has reached the limits of its development and most of them are approaching the end of their technical life. The lack of resources in the armed forces did not allow for significant improvements, a real "change of era", until the mid-2010s.

The Hungarian Ground Forces left Afghanistan in 2021, and announced it had finished evacuations on August 26, 2021. Hungarian Defence Minister Tibor Benkő stated "Hungary is ending evacuations in Afghanistan after airlifting 540 people including Hungarian citizens and Afghans and their families who worked for Hungarian forces previously". Before the withdrawal it was stated in April 2021 "that the number of Hungarian troops present in Afghanistan is already down to just ten."

Structure 

As of 2020, the main combat formations of the HDF Land Command are:
 1st Explosive Ordnance Disposal and River Flotilla Regiment "Honvéd", at Újpest military port in Budapest
 1st Explosive Ordnance Disposal Company
 Special Explosive Ordnance Disposal Company
 River Flotilla
 Explosive Ordnance Disposal K-9 Company
 Logistics Company
 Logistics Battalion
 Training Company2nd Special Forces Brigade "vitéz Árpád Bertalan", in Szolnok Air Base
 Command Company, in Szolnok
 34th Special Forces Battalion László Bercsényi, in Szolnok Air Base
 88th Mixed Light Battalion, in Szolnok Air Base
 5th Infantry Brigade "István Bocskai", in Debrecen
 Command Company, in Debrecen
 3rd Infantry Battalion "Miklós Bercsényi", in Hódmezővásárhely, with BTR-80 APCs
 39th Infantry Battalion in Debrecen, with BTR-80 APCs
 62nd Infantry Battalion in Hódmezővásárhely, with BTR-80 APCs
 Operations Support Engineer Battalion, in Debrecen
 Logistics Battalion, in Debrecen
 Combat Engineer Company, in Debrecen
 Signal Company, in Debrecen24th Reconnaissance Regiment "Gergely Bornemissza" in Debrecen
 Command and Signal Company, in Debrecen
 Reconnaissance Company in Debrecen
 Long-Range Reconnaissance Company in Debrecen
 Tactical Intelligence (HUMINT) Company in Debrecen
 Electronic Warfare Company in Debrecen
 Unmanned Aerial Vehicle Company in Debrecen
 Logistics Company
 25th Infantry Brigade "György Klapka", in Tata
 Command Company, in Tata
 1st Infantry Battalion, in Tata, with BTR-80 APCs
 2nd Infantry Battalion, in Tata, with BTR-80 APCs
 11th Tank Battalion, in Tata, with 44x Leopard 2A7+ main battle tanks
 36th Anti-tank Missile Battalion, in Tata, with 9K115-2 Metis-M anti-tank missiles
 57th Garrison Support Battalion, in Tata
 101st Artillery Battalion, in Tata, with 24x Panzerhaubitze 2000 155 mm self-propelled howitzers
 Logistics Battalion, in Tata
 37th Engineer Regiment "Ferenc Rákóczi II", in Szentes
 Command Support Platoon, in Szentes
 Bridge Building Battalion, in Szentes
 Low Water Bridge Building Company, in Szentes
 Water Purification Company, in Szentes
 Construction Engineer Company, in Szentes
 Training Company, in Szentes
 43rd Signal and Command Support Regiment "József Nagysándor", in Székesfehérvár Command and Guard Company
 Combat Command Main C4I Centre
 Transdanubian Signal and C4I Centre
 Lowland Signal and C4I Centre, at Szolnok Air Base
 Signal Battalion
 Logistics Battalion
 93rd CBRN defense Battalion "Sándor Petőfi", in Székesfehérvár'''
 Command Company
 CBRN-decontaminating Company
 CBRN-reconnaissance Company
 CBRN-support Company
 Support Company

Equipment

Ranks and insignia

See also 
 Military of Hungary
 Royal Hungarian Army (1922–1945)
 Royal Hungarian Landwehr (1867–1918)

Citations

References

 

Military of Hungary
Hungary